Megillat Antiochus ( - "The Scroll of Antiochus"; also "Megillat HaHashmonaim", "Megillat Benei Hashmonai", "Megillat Hanukkah", "Megillat Yoḥanan", "Megillat HaMakabim" or "Megillah Yevanit") recounts the story of Hanukkah and the history of the victory of the Maccabees (or Hasmoneans) over the Seleucid Empire.

It is distinct from the Books of the Maccabees, which describe some of the same events.

History
Early texts of the work exist in both Aramaic and Hebrew, but the Hebrew version is a literal translation from the Aramaic original. It was written somewhere between the 2nd and 5th centuries, with the greater likelihood of it having been composed in the 2nd century. The Hebrew version dates to the 7th century.

The work is first mentioned by Simeon Kayyara (ca. 743 CE) in Halakhot Gedolot, wherein he claims that the scroll was compiled by the "elders of the School of Shammai and the elders of the School of Hillel". Saadia Gaon (882‒942 CE) argued that it was composed in the Aramaic language by the Hasmonaeans themselves, and entitled Megillat Beit Hashmonai. He translated it into Arabic in the 9th century.

The original Aramaic text can be found in an old Yemenite Baladi-rite Prayer Book from the 17th century. The Hebrew text was first published in 1557 in Mantua, northern Italy. The Hebrew text, together with an English translation, can be found in the Siddur of Philip Birnbaum.

Louis Ginzberg declared it a "spurious work" based on "unhistorical sources," with the exception of its citations taken from certain passages from First Book of the Maccabees.

Use in ritual 

During the Middle Ages, Megillat Antiochus was read in the Italian synagogues on Shabbat Hanukkah. A machzor of the Kaffa rite from the year 1735 gives the instruction to read the Megillat Antiochus in the Mincha service of Shabbat Hanukkah. Yemenite Jews of the Baladi rite had it as a custom to read the scroll after the haftarah reading on Shabbat Hanukkah.

Chronology in Megillat Antiochus 

The Scroll of Antiochus equates the 23rd year of the reign of Antiochus Eupator with the 213rd year since the building of the Second Temple. According to Josephus, Antiochus Eupator began his reign in the year 149 of the Seleucid Era, corresponding to 162 BCE, making the 23rd year of his reign 139 BCE. Since, according to the Scroll of Antiochus, the Second Temple had by that time been standing 213 years, this would mean that the Second Temple was completed in 352 BCE.

This date matches traditional Jewish sources, which say that the Second Temple stood 420 years, before being destroyed in the 2nd year of the reign of Vespasian, in 68 CE. However, modern scholarship places the building of the Second Temple in 516 BCE, based on chronologies that emerge from the Babylonian Chronicles.

References

External links

Text 
 A manuscript containing Megillat Antiochus, circa 1480, from the collections of the National Library of Israel
 Original Aramaic text with English, Hebrew and Yiddish translations
 Birnbaum English translation
 Tsel Harim Torah Library English translation
 Hebrew and English texts as PDF
 TorahLab Hebrew and English text with footnotes

Analysis 
 Antiochus, Scroll Of, Louis Ginzberg, jewishencyclopedia.com
 Scroll of Antiochus, Encyclopedia Judaica
 The Scroll of Antiochus, Rabbi Benjamin Zvieli
 The Unknown Chanukah M'gillah
 A Megillah for Hanukkah?, Rabbi David Golinkin, myjewishlearning.com
 Class Lecture Notes on Megillat Antiochus, prepared by Pesach Steinberg, makomshlomo.com

Hasmonean dynasty
Jewish prayer and ritual texts
Rabbinic literature